Geum laciniatum (commonly named rough avens or hairy herb-bennet) is a member of the family Rosaceae.  It is a perennial forb, native to eastern North America.

References

External links
Description by John Hilty at Illinois Wildflowers web site

laciniatum
Flora of the Eastern United States